Trail was the name of a provincial electoral district in the Canadian province of British Columbia located in the West Kootenay region.  It is named after the town of Trail, B.C.  It made its first appearance on the hustings in the election of 1916 .  Its predecessor riding was Rossland City (1903–1912) and from 1924 it was succeeded by the riding of Rossland-Trail.

For other current and historical electoral districts in the Kootenay region, please see Kootenay (electoral districts).

Electoral history 
Note:  Winners of each election are in bold.

|Liberal
|Michael H. Sullivan
|align="right"|484 	
|align="right"|35.23%
|align="right"|
|align="right"|unknown
|- bgcolor="white"
!align="right" colspan=3|Total valid votes
!align="right"|1,372 	
!align="right"|100.00%
!align="right"|
|- bgcolor="white"
!align="right" colspan=3|Total rejected ballots
!align="right"|
!align="right"|
!align="right"|
|- bgcolor="white"
!align="right" colspan=3|Turnout
!align="right"|%
!align="right"|
!align="right"|
|}

|Liberal
|Joseph Stephen Deschamps
|align="right"|848 	 		
|align="right"|39.20%
|align="right"|
|align="right"|unknown

|- bgcolor="white"
!align="right" colspan=3|Total valid votes
!align="right"|2,163 	 
!align="right"|100.00%
!align="right"|
|- bgcolor="white"
!align="right" colspan=3|Total rejected ballots
!align="right"|
!align="right"|
!align="right"|
|- bgcolor="white"
!align="right" colspan=3|Turnout
!align="right"|%
!align="right"|
!align="right"|
|}	

Redistribution following the 1920 election resulted in the merger of the Trail riding with the adjacent Rossland riding to form Rossland-Trail for the 1924 election.  That riding lasted until 1996.   The riding currently representing this area is West Kootenay-Boundary.

Sources 

Elections BC Historical Returns

Former provincial electoral districts of British Columbia